Sainte-Foy-la-Grande is a commune in the Gironde department in Nouvelle-Aquitaine in southwestern France. It is on the south bank of the Dordogne.

History
The town was founded in 1076, near a priory where Sainte Foy was worshipped. The town grew rapidly, and it was renamed to Sainte-Foy-la-Grande in 1363 to distinguish it from towns with similar names in the region. A lot of the town is made from medieval buildings which date back to the 15th century. The town was known for its wine trade and port, where ships left and carried caskets of wine to the United Kingdom and the Netherlands.

During the French reformation in the 16th century, Sainte-Foy became a centre of Calvinism, known as "Little Geneva"; held by the Huguenots during the French Wars of Religion, the town was fought over by both sides. Even after Protestant worship was banned by the 1685 Edict of Fontainebleau, the faith continued to be practised in secret, and in 1828, it became the location of one of the first Protestant schools established in France since 1685.

Population

Notable natives and residents 
 Louis Pierre Gratiolet, anatomist and zoologist, was born here in 1815.
 Paul Broca, surgeon and anthropologist.
 Jacques Dejean, classical violinist, died here in 2013.
 Élie Reclus, ethnographer, was born here.
 Élisée Reclus, geographer and anarchist, was born here.
 Onésime Reclus, his older brother and also a notable geographer, lived here for many years.
 Élie Faure, physician, art critic, writer, essayist, was born here in 1873.
 Gaston Aumoitte, croquet-player and olympic gold-medal winner, died here in 1957.
 Pierre Larthomas (1915-2000), theatre theorist.
 Rémi Lamerat, rugby union player, was born here in 1990.

See also
 Communes of the Gironde department

References

Communes of Gironde
Agenais